Hesamabad (also Romanized as Ḩesāmābād) is a village in Ilat-e Qaqazan-e Gharbi Rural District, Kuhin District, Qazvin County, Qazvin Province, Iran. At the 2006 census, its population was 96, in 31 families.

References 

Populated places in Qazvin County